Ryan Jack Glenn Fallowfield (born 3 January 1996) is an English professional footballer who plays as a right back for National League club York City. Fallowfield started his career at Hull City, though did not make a senior appearance, and has also played for North Ferriby United.

Career
Fallowfield was born in Kingston upon Hull, East Riding of Yorkshire. He joined the academy of Hull City at the age of nine. Fallowfield, who attended Goole High School, signed his first professional contract with the club at the age of 16.

In December 2014, Fallowfield joined Harrogate Town on a one-month loan, which was later extended to three months. In March 2015, Fallowfield left Hull City by mutual consent following his return from his loan at Harrogate Town and subsequently joined Harrogate Town on a permanent basis. He left the club in summer 2016 having suffered from a broken foot during the 2015–16 season, and had a trial at North Ferriby United before joining them on a permanent basis.

In the summer of 2017, Fallowfield returned to Harrogate Town, signing a two-year contract with the club. He was part of the Harrogate team that won promotion to the National League for the first time in the club's history after defeating Brackley Town in the 2018 National League North play-off final.

Fallowfield signed a new contract with Harrogate in the summer of 2020 following their promotion to the Football League for the first time in their history.

Following his release from Harrogate at the end of the 2021–22 season, Fallowfield signed for newly promoted National League club York City in June 2022.

Style of play
He plays as a right back.

Career statistics

Honours
Harrogate Town
National League North play-offs: 2018
National League play-offs: 2020
FA Trophy: 2019–20

References

External links

 
 

1996 births
Living people
Footballers from Kingston upon Hull
English footballers
Association football defenders
Hull City A.F.C. players
Harrogate Town A.F.C. players
North Ferriby United A.F.C. players
York City F.C. players
National League (English football) players
English Football League players